Kellie Abrams (born 10 December 1978 in Ballarat, Victoria) is an Australian professional basketball player for the Canberra Capitals in the Women's National Basketball League.

As the captain of the Capitals, Abrams plays as a guard, and standing at 175 cm, she can also be a forward. She made her debut in the  WNBL in 1995 with the Australian Institute of Sport team and moved to the Capitals in 1997. She was part of the Canberra Capitals championship winning teams in 2001/02, 2002/03, and 2006/07. She was voted the best defender in the Capitals lineup for the 2002/03 season.

References

Living people
1978 births
Australian women's basketball players
Sportspeople from Ballarat
Canberra Capitals players
Australian Institute of Sport basketball (WNBL) players
Guards (basketball)